Varan (also Romanized as Varān and Vārān; also known as Wārūn) is a village in Jasb Rural District, in the Central District of Delijan County, Markazi Province, Iran. At the 2006 census, its population was 257, in 114 families.

References 

fa;واران

Populated places in Delijan County